The Mysterious Miss X is a 1939 film directed by Gus Meins and starring Michael Whalen, Chick Chandler and Mary Hart.

Plot
Out of work when their play about a police inspector closes, actors Keith and Scooter are traveling by bus when they run out of money to go farther. A passenger, Julie Graham, helps them find a room. They instead find a dead body, with police suspecting them of killing a rich businessman named Pratt.

A new suspect emerges in the form of Pratt's secretary, Charlie Graham, when $5,000 in cash is found in his possession. Graham is arrested and daughter Julie calls family attorney Clarence Fredericks to represent him.

The actors, meantime, are mistaken for actual detectives when police find the script of their play. They resist a request for their help until the attractive Julie also asks, as does Alma Pratt, the dead man's widow, who offers them a fee to investigate. The boys place themselves in danger, discovering that Fredericks is the actual killer. They get out of town safely, with Julie riding along with Scooter, now romantically involved.

Cast
 Michael Whalen as Keith Neville
 Chick Chandler as Scooter Casey
 Mary Hart as Julie Graham
 Dorothy Tree as Alma
 Regis Toomey as Jack Webster
 Don Douglas as Clarence Fredericks

References

External links
The Mysterious Miss X at IMDb

1939 films
1939 mystery films
American mystery films
American black-and-white films
1930s American films
1930s English-language films